"Light Switch" is a song by American singer-songwriter Charlie Puth. It was released on January 20, 2022, as the lead single from his third studio album, Charlie (2022). Puth solely produced the song and wrote it alongside Jacob Kasher and Jake Torrey. A funky, uptempo track, the song lyrically sees Puth crooning about his attraction to a love interest. The song was teased several times on his TikTok account, causing the video to go viral on the platform, with many videos being made using the audio. 

Commercially, "Light Switch" reached number one in Singapore, and charted in the top ten in Malaysia and Vietnam. It reached the top 40 in Canada, worldwide, Ireland, Lithuania, New Zealand, Sweden, Switzerland, and the United Kingdom, and peaked at number 27 on the Billboard Hot 100.

Background
In November 2021, Puth revealed "a single" would come out in 2022 by responding to a comment on Twitter. "Light Switch" then was teased on TikTok that same month, showing him documenting the production of the song. The video went viral on the platform, with a presave for the song made available on November 24, 2021. Throughout the rest of 2021, Puth kept teasing the song in various videos on TikTok. On January 18, 2022, Puth revealed the release date and cover art for "Light Switch" on his social media accounts.

Music video
A few hours after the song's release, an official music video for the song premiered on Puth's YouTube channel. The music video was directed by Christian Breslauer. The music video begins with Puth out of shape after an implied breakup, watching TV on his recliner. A Tae Bo instructor (Billy Blanks) he sees, crawls out of the TV and encourages him to get back into shape with some workouts and other activities, such as fence painting, cleaning, and buying $100 worth of Bitcoin. Puth is later shown performing the last chorus to his ex in front of a bright sign that says "SORRY", only to find out the ex has gotten a new, out of shape, boyfriend. The trainer arrives, leading Puth away. In the comments of the video on YouTube, Puth says, "I created the concept for this music video based on an idea I had and shared with the incredible director, Christian Breslauer. I wanted to humorously portray all the things we sometimes try to change about ourselves in order to capture that unrequited love, when deep down we should be changing our lives only to benefit ourselves and no one else." The music video also includes product placements from Regal Select Exterior Paint by Benjamin Moore and the cryptocurrency company Coinbase.

Charts

Weekly charts

Monthly charts

Year-end charts

Certifications

Release history

References

2022 singles
2022 songs
Number-one singles in Singapore
Songs written by Charlie Puth
Songs written by Jacob Kasher
Charlie Puth songs